Albert Ernest Green (21 December 1869 – 2 October 1940) was an Australian politician. He arrived in Western Australia in 1895, and represented the Kalgoorlie area in both state and federal parliaments for the Australian Labor Party, as well as serving as Minister for Defence and later Postmaster-General in the Scullin Ministry.

Biography
Green was born and went to primary school in Avoca, Victoria, but left school to work for a telephone company in Ballarat and later in the family's bricklaying business.  He travelled in the United States and Central America between 1889 and 1895 and as a result was known as "Texas". He was active in the brickmasons' society at San Francisco, and it was even suggested by one contemporary source that he had assisted revolutionary insurgents in Guatemala. In June 1895, he moved to Western Australia and established a branch of the Australian Natives' Association (A.N.A.) in Perth.  In November 1895, he became a postal clerk in the gold rush town of Coolgardie.  He was soon transferred to nearby Kalgoorlie, where he founded branches of the A.N.A. and the Post and Telegraphists' Union and became involved in local Labour politics.  He married Emily Eleanor Berry in January 1899 at St John's Church, Kalgoorlie

Political career

State politics
Green won the Western Australian Legislative Assembly seat of Kalgoorlie in the 1911 election, following the retirement of the independent member, Norbert Keenan. In December 1913, he resigned to seek pre-selection for the Federal seat of Kalgoorlie but lost to Hugh Mahon.  He was re-elected to the state seat in October 1914 and held it to March 1921, when he was defeated by the independent Nationalist candidate John Boyland. Between March 1921 and December 1922 he worked for the Westralian Worker newspaper.

Federal politics

Green won the federal Kalgoorlie seat at the 1922 election, defeating the incumbent Nationalist member George Foley, and held it until his death. He campaigned for a strong air force and was appointed Minister for Defence in the Scullin government in October 1929. Despite the onset of the Great Depression, he implemented a training scheme for Australian pilots and purchased several aircraft. He also abolished compulsory military service. In February 1931, following the resignation of Joseph Lyons, he was appointed Postmaster-General and Minister for Works and Railways. He was upset by Lyons' defection from the Labor Party and, according to Geoffrey Bolton, Green chased Lyons' train along the Canberra railway station platform shouting "For God's sake, don't do it, Joe!"  In opposition after the 1931 election, he campaigned for fellow Western Australian John Curtin to be elected party leader.

Death
Green died at East Coolgardie on 2 October 1940, survived by his wife and three sons and a daughter.

Notes

1869 births
1940 deaths
Australian Labor Party members of the Parliament of Australia
Members of the Western Australian Legislative Assembly
Members of the Australian House of Representatives for Kalgoorlie
Members of the Australian House of Representatives
Members of the Cabinet of Australia
Defence ministers of Australia
20th-century Australian politicians
Postmasters General of Australia